Luis Rafael de la Trinidad Otilio Ulate Blanco (August 25, 1891 – October 10, 1973) served as President of Costa Rica from 1949 to 1953. His French heritage comes from his mother, Ermida Blanco. He never married but had two daughters, Olga Marta Ulate Rojas (1937–2007) and Maria Ermida Ulate Rojas (1938) with Haydee Rojas Smith (British origins) 

His disputed election in 1948, whereby he was denied victory by the legislature in favor of Rafael Ángel Calderón Guardia, was the direct cause of José Figueres Ferrer's armed uprising of that year and the ensuing 44-day Costa Rican Civil War.

Blanco started his career in politics as a journalist, director of local newspaper La Tribuna and owner of Diario de Costa Rica, principal newspaper at the time, where he directed his major political campaigns.

Ulate led the opposition party during the February 8th 1948 elections, where he defeated ex President Rafael Ángel Calderón Guardia.

His government proved a good handling of economical development, Ulate raised the Consejo Nacional de Produccion (CNP)-National Production Committee-, the Central Bank of de Costa Rica (main financial institution in Costa Rica), the Contraloria General de la Republica (regulates government and public institutions' budgets and expenses), the "Ley del Aguinaldo" (law that enforces a 13th month paid salary for all Costa Rican workers during Christmas time), the right for women to vote in National Elections and the foundations for the actual International Juan Santamaria Airport (called "El Coco"), despite the fact that many of his achievements were self-recognized by following presidents. During a visit to the penitentiary in San Lucas Island he also ordered the release of Beltrán Cortés from the unusually public and confined cell President León Cortés Castro had ordered for him and placed him with the other prisoners.

He was the ambassador of Costa Rica to Spain from 1970 to 1971.

References

1891 births
1973 deaths
People from Alajuela
National Union Party (Costa Rica) politicians
National Unification Party (Costa Rica) politicians
Presidents of Costa Rica
Members of the Legislative Assembly of Costa Rica
Ambassadors of Costa Rica to Spain
Costa Rican journalists
Male journalists
People of the Costa Rican Civil War
Knights Grand Cross of the Order of Isabella the Catholic
Costa Rican liberals
20th-century journalists